Anne Plumptre (1760–1818) was an English writer and translator sometimes collaborating with her sister Annabella Plumptre.

Life
Anne was born in Norwich.  She and her sister, Annabella [Bell] Plumptre were daughters of Robert Plumptre, became active in the Enfield circle, a local group of literati. Later she became involved in politics during the period of the French Revolution. She published her own fiction, travel writing and political enquiry, as well as many translations of letters, travel writing, drama, and other genres.

Anne was the second daughter of Dr. Robert Plumptre, who became President of Queens' College, Cambridge. Her brother James Plumptre was known as a dramatist. She was well educated in foreign languages, particularly in German. She began writing articles in periodicals. The freethinking Alexander Geddes encouraged her. Her first book, a novel in two volumes, entitled Antoinette, was published anonymously, but was acknowledged in a second edition.

Anne was one of the first to make German plays known in London, and in 1798 and 1799 translated many of the dramas of Kotzebue, following up this work with a Life and Literary Career of Kotzebue, translated from the German and published in 1801. From 1802 to 1805 she resided in France, and published her experiences in 1810 in the Narrative of a Three Years Residence in France (3 vols.) Lucy Brightwell states that she accompanied John Opie and Amelia Opie to Paris in August 1802. She became well known as a supporter of Napoleon; in 1810 she declared that she would welcome him if he invaded England, because he would do away with the aristocracy and give the country a better government.

In 1814–15 she visited Ireland, and recorded her experiences in the Narrative of a Residence in Ireland, published in 1817. It was ridiculed by John Wilson Croker in the Quarterly Review. Her other contributions to literature consist mainly of translations of travels from the French and German. Helen Maria Williams, the poet, was a close friend. She died in Norwich on 20 October 1818, at the age of 58, after a "productive and for the most part successful literary career" (Shaffer).

Notes

References
Elinor Shaffer. "Plumptre, Anne (1760–1818)." Oxford Dictionary of National Biography. Ed. H. C. G. Matthew and Brian Harrison. Oxford: OUP, 2004. 22 November 2006.

External links
Anne Plumptre, Corvey Women Writers on the Web.
The Natural Son. Ed. Thomas C. Crochunis. British Women Playwrights around 1800. 15 July 2000.

English dramatists and playwrights
British women dramatists and playwrights
Writers of the Romantic era
1760 births
1818 deaths
Writers from Norwich
18th-century British women writers
18th-century British writers
19th-century English women writers
19th-century British writers
British women travel writers
British travel writers
18th-century English women
18th-century English people